Alexander George Henry Gilbert (born 28 December 2001) is a professional footballer who plays as a left winger for  club Brentford. He is a graduate of the West Bromwich Albion Academy and has been capped by the Republic of Ireland at youth level.

Club career

West Bromwich Albion 
A left winger or forward, Gilbert began his career in the West Bromwich Albion Academy at U9 level and progressed to sign a two-year scholarship deal in 2018. He was offered a professional contract at the end of the 2019–20 season, but declined to sign it and departed The Hawthorns.

Brentford 
On 29 September 2020, Gilbert transferred to the B team at Championship club Brentford on a two-year contract, with the option of a further year, on a free transfer. Gilbert was an unused substitute during 9 first team league matches between December 2020 and March 2021 and made two FA Cup appearances. He was not involved during Brentford's successful 2021 playoff campaign and finished the 2020–21 B team season with 10 goals from 22 appearances.

Gilbert was involved with the first team squad during the 2021–22 pre-season and on transfer deadline day August 2021, he joined League Two club Swindon Town on loan until the end of the 2021–22 season. He made 12 appearances prior to the termination of the loan on 4 January 2022. Gilbert played the second half of the 2021–22 season with the B team, with whom he won the London Senior Cup.

The one-year option on Gilbert's contract was taken up at the end of the 2021–22 season and he captained the B team early in the campaign. On 8 November 2022, Gilbert won his first senior call-up for nearly two years, for an EFL Cup third round match versus Gillingham and he remained an unused substitute during the shoot-out defeat. Gilbert was included in the first team squad for its mid-season training camp in Girona and scored in a 2–1 friendly defeat to Bordeaux.

International career 
Gilbert was capped by the Republic of Ireland at U19 level. In March 2021, he won his maiden call up to the U21 team for a training camp and friendly match versus Wales U21. He played the opening 69 minutes of the 2–1 victory.

Personal life 
Gilbert supported Aston Villa while growing up.

Career statistics

Honours 
Brentford B

 London Senior Cup: 2021–22

References

External links 

 
 Alex Gilbert at brentfordfc.com
 

2001 births
Living people
Footballers from Birmingham, West Midlands
Republic of Ireland association footballers
Republic of Ireland youth international footballers
English footballers
English people of Irish descent
Brentford F.C. players
Association football wingers
Association football forwards
Republic of Ireland under-21 international footballers
Swindon Town F.C. players
English Football League players